Craugastor stejnegerianus is a species of frog in the family Craugastoridae.
It is found in Costa Rica and Panama.
Its natural habitats are subtropical or tropical dry forests, subtropical or tropical moist lowland forests, subtropical or tropical moist montane forests, pastureland, plantations, and heavily degraded former forest.
It is threatened by habitat loss.

References

 Solís, F., Ibáñez, R., Chaves, G., Savage, J., Jaramillo, C. & Fuenmayor, Q. 2004.  Craugastor stejnegerianus.   2006 IUCN Red List of Threatened Species.   Downloaded on 22 July 2007.

stejneg
Amphibians of Costa Rica
Amphibians of Panama
Frogs of North America
Least concern biota of North America
Amphibians described in 1893
Taxonomy articles created by Polbot